Hell Squad is a 1958 American World War II film, produced, written and directed by Burt Topper. It was his very first film. AIP originally released the film as a double feature with Tank Battalion.

Plot
During World War II, a squad of five American soldiers become lost in Tunisia and are killed one by one in fights with German units. Finally only one man, Private Russo, is left, in the midst of a mine field, together with a German officer, locked in a stalemate. Russo has water, while the German claims to have a map revealing the mine positions. So Russo agrees to swap water for the map, but the German officer tries to double-cross him.

Main cast
 Wally Campo as Private Russo
 Brandon Carroll as German Officer
 Fred Gavlin as Sergeant Clemens
 Gregg Stewart as Private Nelson
 Leon Schrier as Private Roth
 Cecil Addis as Private Lippy

Production and release
The film was shot in Indio, California in 1957 on 16mm. Shooting took six months and was done mostly on weekends. It cost Topper $11,500 to make.

The film was originally titled The Ground They Walk, but was retitled Hell Squad when American International Pictures bought the cinema distribution rights.
It was released in July 1958 as part of a double feature with the Korean War film Tank Battalion.

References

External links
 
 

1958 films
American International Pictures films
North African campaign films
1958 directorial debut films
Films directed by Burt Topper
Films produced by Burt Topper
1950s English-language films
American World War II films